Fatenah is the first 3D animated film made in the Palestinian territories.

Plot
Fatenah revolves around the main character, a young adult living in Palestine.  While conducting a self-examination she discovers a lump. The story evolves around her attempt to get medical attention for the lump while living in the Palestinian territories.

Production
The film uses real photographs of the region as background images, bringing additional realism.

References
 Animation confronts Gaza breast cancer taboo

External links
 Ahmad Habash website

Palestinian animated short films
2009 films
2009 computer-animated films
Films about cancer